The following lists events that happened during 1987 in Australia.

Incumbents

Monarch – Elizabeth II
Governor-General – Sir Ninian Stephen
Prime Minister –  Bob Hawke
Deputy Prime Minister – Lionel Bowen
Opposition Leader – John Howard
Chief Justice – Sir Harry Gibbs (until 5 February) then Sir Anthony Mason

State and Territory Leaders
Premier of New South Wales – Barrie Unsworth
Opposition Leader – Nick Greiner
Premier of Queensland – Sir Joh Bjelke-Petersen (until 1 December), then Mike Ahern
Opposition Leader – Nev Warburton
Premier of South Australia – John Bannon
Opposition Leader – John Olsen
Premier of Tasmania – Robin Gray
Opposition Leader – Neil Batt
Premier of Victoria – John Cain Jr.
Opposition Leader – Jeff Kennett
Premier of Western Australia – Brian Burke
Opposition Leader – Barry MacKinnon
Chief Minister of the Northern Territory – Stephen Hatton
Opposition Leader – Terry Smith
President of the Legislative Assembly of Norfolk Island – John Brown

Governors and Administrators
Governor of New South Wales – Sir James Rowland
Governor of Queensland – Sir Walter Campbell
Governor of South Australia – Sir Donald Dunstan
Governor of Tasmania – Sir James Plimsoll (until 8 May), then Sir Phillip Bennett
Governor of Victoria – Davis McCaughey
Governor of Western Australia – Gordon Reid
Administrator of Norfolk Island – John Matthew
Administrator of the Northern Territory – Eric Johnston

Events

January
31 January – A rally in Wagga Wagga, New South Wales, of new ultra-right Grassroots 2000 represents a declaration of war by Queensland Premier Sir Joh Bjelke-Petersen and the religious right on the "wets" and "losers" in the Liberal Party of Australia such as Ian Macphee, Peter Baume, Chris Puplick, Robert Hill, Steele Hall and Max Burr.  The movement is predicated on the populist appeal of a flat tax, the suppression of trade union power and small government.

February
4 February – Federal Opposition Leader John Howard launches the Opposition's election strategy, promising lower taxes, family policies, needs-based social welfare, and an end to the fringe benefits tax.  His coining of the word "incentivation" draws some derision.
6 February – 
Sir Anthony Mason replaces Sir Harry Gibbs as Chief Justice of the High Court of Australia.  With other retirements, for the first time the High Court contains no former politicians.
Mary Gaudron is sworn in as the first female Justice of the High Court of Australia.
8 February – 9 February – Worried by the damage to their electoral prospects, John Howard, Ian Sinclair and Liberal President John Valder unite to pour scorn on Sir Joh Bjelke-Petersen's federal pretensions, hoping that common sense will dissolve the "initial seduction of simplistic solutions".
23 February – The first mobile phone call in Australia is made.
28 February – The Central Council of the Queensland National Party decides to withdraw its 12 federal MPs from the Coalition.  They officially leave on 10 April.

March
7 March – An election in the Northern Territory returns CLP government of Stephen Hatton to power.
23 March – Following the publication of transcripts of damaging car phone conversations between Jeff Kennett and Andrew Peacock, John Howard dismisses Andrew Peacock from the Shadow Cabinet.
26 March – Peter Baume resigns from the Shadow Cabinet because of the Liberal Party's opposition to equal opportunity legislation.

April
15 April – Ian Sinclair and John Howard sign a Coalition Agreement which formalises the split with the Queensland Nationals.
21 April – Federal Opposition Leader John Howard reshuffles the Shadow Cabinet, omitting the remaining "wet" Ian McPhee and elevating more "dries".
28 April – The Coalition comes to a temporary end when Liberal Leader John Howard excoriates Sir Joh Bjelke-Petersen and Queensland National Party President Sir Robert Sparkes as "wreckers".

May
28 May – Only 8 weeks after promising no early poll, but unable to resist the opportunity afforded by Coalition disarray, Prime Minister Bob Hawke calls a double dissolution election, the trigger used being the Senate's rejection of the Australia Card legislation.  The National Party of Australia's campaign collapses as Sir Joh Bjelke-Petersen is out of the country when the election is called.

June
16 June – Crazed German tourist Joseph Schwab, known as the "Kimberley killer", is shot dead in a shootout with Western Australia Police at Fitzroy Crossing. Schwab had already killed three people that day, and two others a week previously in the Northern Territory.
23 June – Launching a long campaign at the Sydney Opera House, Prime Minister Bob Hawke promises that "no child will be living in poverty by the year 1990" and woos the environmental vote by promising no mining in Kakadu. 
25 June – Federal Opposition Leader John Howard makes his policy speech as a rousing call to middle Australia.

July
11 July – With a good deal of help from the Joh for Canberra campaign which splits the conservative vote between his National Party and the Liberal Party's John Howard, Bob Hawke's Australian Labor Party government is re-elected for a third term.  Labor wins six Queensland seats from the Coalition.  A net gain of four seats despite a 1.7% fall in their primary vote gives the Labor Party 86 seats to the Liberals' 43 and Nationals' 19.  In the Senate, seven Australian Democrats senators again hold the balance.
16 July – John Howard retains the Liberal leadership, beating Andrew Peacock in the post-election party room spill 41:28. He is forced to accept his rival as deputy when Andrew Peacock beats Fred Chaney 36:24.
24 July – Prime Minister Bob Hawke undertakes a major reorganisation of the Commonwealth Public Service, reducing the number of departments from 27 to 17, 8 of them "super" departments covering a range of areas.  John Dawkins becomes Minister for Employment, Education and Training and Graham Richardson receives the Environment and the Arts portfolio.

August
9 August – Seven people are killed and 19 injured when 19-year-old Julian Knight goes on a shooting rampage in Melbourne – the (Hoddle St Massacre).
14 August – All the children held at Kia Lama, a rural property on Lake Eildon run by the Santiniketan Park Association, are released after a police raid.
17 August – Tony Eggleton's reforms to tighten the Liberal Party of Australia's discipline and procedures are accepted at the Federal Executive meeting.  Liberal Leader John Howard then reconstructs his Coalition with the 26 Nationals, only four of whom had opposed the restoration of the agreement.

September
23 September – The increasingly unpopular Australia Card is abandoned when retired public servant Ewart Sith points out that although the Bill could be passed at a joint sitting, it could not be put into practice due to poor drafting, which has omitted a starting date – the regulation to set one would have to go to a still hostile Senate.

October
3 October – Australia finally notes the contribution of the Vietnam War veterans with a Welcome Home parade held in Sydney – 15 years after the last soldiers and national service men have returned.
20 October – Black Monday: After the largest fall in the Dow Jones's history, stock markets nosedive around the world. Australia is no exception as the All Ordinaries falls 25%, making it the biggest one-day drop in the market's history.

November
13 November – Despite support from Queensland Premier Sir Joh Bjelke-Petersen, enabling legislation for the construction of the planned 107-storey Minuzzo Tower is deferred.  Deferment was called for by National Party backbenchers, so that guidelines could be drawn up for super-high rise structures of more than 60 storeys.  The planned tower would have been the world's tallest building.
24 November – Queensland Premier Sir Joh Bjelke-Petersen sacks three ministers from his cabinet, accusing them of gross disloyalty.
26 November – The National Party deposes Sir Joh Bjelke-Petersen as party leader, but he refuses to resign as premier. He was not present at the caucus meeting.

December
1 December – Sir Joh Bjelke-Petersen resigns as Premier of Queensland after 19 years at the top. He is replaced by Mike Ahern, who becomes the only premier never to contest an election as premier.
8 December – 
Queen Street Massacre: 22-year-old Frank Vitkovic kills 8 and injures another 5 in an Australia Post office building in Queen Street, Melbourne before committing suicide by jumping from the 11th floor.
The Queensland Premier's Department releases a list of 60 companies which had expressed an interest in developing Australia's first space port in Queensland's Cape York area.
29 December – 19-year-old Neighbours star Kylie Minogue enters the charts with her first single "I Should Be So Lucky".
31 December – Senator Susan Ryan, Minister assisting the Prime Minister for the Status of Women, resigns to take a private sector job.  The post is demoted outside Cabinet under her successor Margaret Reynolds.  Former Australian Labor Party Federal Secretary Bob McMullan takes over Susan Ryan's Senate term.

Arts and literature
 Glenda Adams's novel Dancing on Coral wins the Miles Franklin Award

Film
Howling III
Travelling North
The Lighthorsemen
The Year My Voice Broke

Television
January – Alan Bond, who already owns QTQ-9 & STW-9 purchases TCN-9 & GTV-9 from Kerry Packer for $1.055 billion. The expanded Nine Network becomes the first coast-to-coast network.
February – Fairfax, owners of ATN-7 & BTQ-7 purchase HSV-7 from The Herald and Weekly Times Ltd for $320 million. The move sees the replacement of most Melbourne-produced programming with networked programming from Sydney, including long-running shows such as World of Sport & sees Mal Walden sacked as newsreader. The revamped news service, read by former STW-9 newsreader Greg Pearce plunges to as low as zero in the ratings.
6 April – Long running UK children's television series Thomas the Tank Engine & Friends gets its first Australian television transmission on ABC.
July – Westfield buys Network Ten from Rupert Murdoch's News Limited for $842 million.
19 July – Long-running ABC music program Countdown broadcasts its final episode.
August – New cross-media ownership rules force the sale of the Seven Network. Fairfax sells its stations to Christopher Skase's Qintex company for $780 million.
27 December – Rupert Murdoch's ownership of ADS-7, combined with TVW-7's ownership of SAS-10, result in the stations deciding to swap callsigns & affiliations. So, on this day, ADS-7 becomes ADS-10 & SAS-10 becomes SAS-7.

Sport
4 February – The 1987 America's Cup ends in Perth with the US regaining the America's Cup after Australia won it in 1983 as the first Nation ever after US-Teams won it 25 times for 132 years in a row.
22 March – Steve Moneghetti is Australia's best finisher in the men's competition at the IAAF World Cross Country Championships, staged in Warsaw, Poland. He finishes in 11th place (37:11.0) in the long-distance race over 11,950 metres. In the women's competition Krishna Stanton ends up in 8th place in the long event (5.050 metres).
27 March – The Brisbane Bears (now the Brisbane Lions) make their debut in the VFL. At the MCG, the Bears upset North Melbourne 19.23.137 to 15.12.104.
29 March – The West Coast Eagles make their debut in the Victorian Football League. At Subiaco Oval, they defeat the Richmond Tigers 20.13.133 to 16.12.119.
5 April – It is announced that Newcastle will join the NSWRL in 1988. They are later joined by Brisbane and the Gold Coast to form a 16-team competition.
7 June – Daniel Boltz wins the men's national marathon title, clocking 2:14:36 in Sydney, while Tani Ruckle claims the women's title in 2:37:53.
15 July – Queensland win the 1987 State of Origin series by defeating New South Wales 10–8 in the third and deciding game.
26 September – The Carlton Blues (15.14.104) defeat the Hawthorn Hawks (9.17.71) to win the 91st VFL/AFL premiership.
27 September – Manly-Warringah Sea Eagles defeat the Canberra Raiders 18–8 to win the 80th NSWRL premiership. It is the last grand final ever to be played at the SCG. The Western Suburbs Magpies finish in last position, claiming the wooden spoon.
The Dally M Medal and the Rothmans Medal are won by Parramatta Eels halfback Peter Sterling. 
The Clive Churchill medal for man of the match is won by Manly-Warringah Sea Eagles five-eighth Cliff Lyons.
The Brownlow Medal is shared by John Platten (Hawthorn) and Tony Lockett (St Kilda). Lockett becomes the first full-forward to win the Brownlow Medal.

Births
15 January – Greg Inglis, rugby league footballer
19 January – Angus Monfries, Australian footballer
30 January 
Ben Cutting, cricketer
Lance Franklin, Australian Rules footballer
15 February – Jarrod Sammut, rugby league player
21 February – Heli Simpson, actress, singer, dancer, equestrian, comedian, and doctor
27 February – Bridie Kean, wheelchair basketball player
18 April – Samantha Jade, singer
30 April – Nikki Webster, singer and model
1 May – Marcus Drum, Australian footballer
26 May – Josh Thomas, comedian and actor
27 May – Bella Heathcote, actress
5 June – Shea Moylan, rugby league player
17 June – Rebecca Breeds, actress
30 June – Tim Blanchard, racing driver
15 July – Jimmy Rees, entertainer
17 July
Gemma Beadsworth, water polo player
Darius Boyd, rugby league footballer
27 July – Simon Dunn, bobsledder (died 2023)
31 July – Brittany Byrnes, actress
16 August 
Evan Berger, footballer
Kyal Marsh, actor
18 August – Robert McNamara, figure skater
 1 October – Mitchell Aubusson, rugby league player
18 October – Sam Clark, actor
29 October – Cleopatra Coleman, actress
10 December – Ben Nicholas, actor
21 December – Brad Howard, Australian rules footballer

Deaths
 3 April – Lynda Heaven (born 1902), first female Labor MHR in Tasmania
 14 April – Brian Carlson (born 1933), rugby league player 
 28 July – Jack Renshaw (born 1909), Premier of New South Wales
 17 August – Olga Agnew (born 1899), child actress

See also
 1987 in Australian television
 List of Australian films of 1987

References

 
Australia
Years of the 20th century in Australia